Love, Antosha is a 2019 American documentary film directed and produced by Garret Price, focusing on the life and career of late actor Anton Yelchin. The film premiered in the Doc Premieres category at the 2019 Sundance Film Festival on January 28, 2019. The film was released by Lurker Productions in New York and Los Angeles in August 2019.

Premise
The film reveals Yelchin's struggle with cystic fibrosis, which his parents told him about when he was 17 and he hid from close friends, colleagues, and the public. The film further shows Yelchin's passion for his artistic pursuits and close relationship with his parents. Nicolas Cage stars as the narrator of the film, reading Yelchin's various writings.

Interviews

J. J. Abrams
Sofia Boutella
John Cho
Marlon Clark
Ian Cripps
Willem Dafoe
Joe Dante
Paul David
Drake Doremus
Ben Foster
Jodie Foster
Craig Gillespie
Dave Glowacki
Bryce Dallas Howard
Nick Jones
Avy Kaufman
Martin Landau †
Frank Langella
Jennifer Lawrence
Mary Lester
Mark Palansky
Simon Pegg
Chris Pine
Jon Poll
Zachary Quinto
Purush Rao
Zoe Saldana
Luke Shaft
Sophie Simpson
Kristen Stewart
Anya Taylor-Joy
Gena Tuso
Jon Voight
Richard Wicklund

† = Person interviewed died prior to the documentary's release.

Production
Jon Voight, Yelchin's co-star from the 2015 short film Court of Conscience, initially suggested to Yelchin's parents to create a documentary. They first reached out to Drake Doremus, who had directed Yelchin in Like Crazy, but Doremus felt he was too close to Yelchin to direct a film and suggested Garret Price.

Reception
The site's consensus reads: "Using raw materials left behind by its subject, Love, Antosha takes a thoughtful -- and powerful -- look at a life and career cut short." Metacritic reports an aggregated score of 78 based on 14 reviews, indicating "generally favorable reviews".

Andrew Barker of Variety wrote that the film was "a touching and surprising portrait of an actor who had much more going on in his life — from a serious illness to some seriously left-field artistic inclinations — than was mentioned in his obituaries.”

Pat Padua of The Washington Post gave Love, Antosha 3 out of 5, saying that "at once charming and bittersweet. But the film loses focus a little as it heaps accolades on the late actor". Glenn Kenny of The New York Times said that "[Love, Antosha is] affectionate, heartbreaking documentary about [actor's] life, directed by Garret Price, presents Yelchin as a soldier of cinema, and a lot more".

Stephen Farber of The Hollywood Reporter said that Love, Antosha is "a rich reminiscence of a gifted actor who died far too young". Kenneth Turan of the Los Angeles Times said in his opening comments "You feel the love in 'Love, Antosha' that’s for sure. But you also feel something else, a sadness that is close to overwhelming".

References

External links

American documentary films
Biographical documentary films
2019 documentary films
Documentary films about actors
2010s American films
Films about disability